Hino do Estado de Santa Catarina is the anthem of the Brazilian state of Santa Catarina. Horário Nunes wrote the words and José Brazilício de Souza composed the music.

Text in Portuguese
Sagremos num hino de estrelas e flores
Num canto sublime de glórias e luz,
As festas que os livres frementes de ardores,
Celebram nas terras gigantes da cruz.

Quebram-se férreas cadeias,
Rojam algemas no chão;
Do povo nas epopéias
Fulge a luz da redenção.
Quebram-se férreas cadeias,
Rojam algemas no chão;
Do povo nas epopéias
Fulge a luz da redenção.

No céu peregrino da Pátria gigante
Que é berço de glórias e berço de heróis
Levanta-se em ondas de luz deslumbrante,
O sol, Liberdade cercada de sóis.

Pela força do Direito
pela força da Razão,
Cai por terra o preconceito
Levanta-se uma Nação.
Pela força do Direito
pela força da Razão,
Cai por terra o preconceito
Levanta-se uma Nação.

Não mais diferenças de sangues e raças
Não mais regalias sem termos fatais,
A força está toda do povo nas massas,
irmãos somos todos e todos iguais.

Da liberdade adorada.
No deslumbrante clarão
Banha o povo a fronte ousada
E avigora o coração.
Da liberdade adorada.
No deslumbrante clarão
Banha o povo a fronte ousada
E avigora o coração.

O povo que é grande mas não vingativo
Que nunca a justiça e o Direito calou
Com flores e festas deu vida ao cativo,
Com festas e flores o trono esmagou.

Quebrou-se a algema do escravo
E nesta grande Nação
É cada homem um bravo
Cada bravo um cidadão.
Quebrou-se a algema do escravo
E nesta grande Nação
É cada homem um bravo
Cada bravo um cidadão.

References

Regional songs
Portuguese-language songs
Brazilian anthems
Santa Catarina (state)
Year of song missing